Grylls may refer to:

 Bear Grylls (born 1974), British television presenter and adventurer
 Brendon Grylls (born 1973), Australian politician
 David Grylls (born 1957), American track cyclist
 Karen Grylls (born 1951), New Zealand choral conductor
 Michael Grylls (1934–2001), British politician
 Pinny Grylls, British documentary filmmaker
 Rosalie Glynn Grylls (1905–1988), British biographer, lecturer and politician
 Vaughan Grylls (born 1943), British artist and educationalist

See also
 Burlison and Grylls, English glass manufacturer
 Grills